Puerto Carabuco is a location in the La Paz Department in Bolivia.

References 

 Gobierno Electrónico Oficial, de Puerto Mayor Carabuco
 Web Site de Puerto Carabuco
 Instituto Nacional de Estadistica de Bolivia

External links 
 Puerto Carabuco Municipality: population data and map 

Populated places in La Paz Department (Bolivia)